The Pearl Jam 2015 Latin America Tour was a concert tour by the American rock band Pearl Jam. The tour consisted of nine shows in Latin America, including venues in Chile, Brazil, Colombia, Mexico and Argentina. This was the first tour following the Lightning Bolt Tour that finished in 2014 and the first shows in Latin American since the band released their 2013 album Lightning Bolt. The tour started on November 4 in Santiago, Chile, and finished on November 28 in Mexico City. On August 6, it was announced that the show in Colombia will be moved from Estadio El Campín to Simón Bolívar Park.

The tour started in Santiago, with the band covering John Lennon's song "Imagine" during their set. Writing for Consequence of Sound, Alex Young called it "a truly surreal moment". At the show in Porto Alegre on November 11, the band covered Pink Floyd's song "Comfortably Numb" for the first time. At the show in São Paulo the band dedicated their song "Love Boat Captain" to the victims of the Paris attacks, which took place the previous day. They continued the tour by playing their first ever show in Bogotá, Colombia on November 25. The tour concluded with a show at the Foro Sol Stadium in Mexico City, in front of more than 60,000 people.

Tour dates

Band members
Pearl Jam
Jeff Ament – bass guitar
Stone Gossard – rhythm guitar
Mike McCready – lead guitar
Eddie Vedder – lead vocals, guitar
Matt Cameron – drums

Additional musicians
Boom Gaspar – Hammond B3 and keyboards

References

2015 concert tours
Pearl Jam concert tours